"Narrator" is a song by British post-punk band Squid. It is the first single from their debut album, Bright Green Field. The song was released on January 27, 2021, under Warp. It features vocals from Martha Skye Murphy. Narrator is eight minutes long and was released along with an edited version. The song is a buildup, initially beginning calm. By the end, there is a "scream-ridden finale" with "shrieking instrumentals".

Background
"Narrator" was inspired by a 2019 film, Long Day's Journey Into Night. The lyrics of the song describe a man who is unable to distinguish dreams from reality. Because of this, he becomes his own narrator. Squid said this about the song in a press release: 
Martha Skye Murphy takes the role of the "woman wanting to break free" from the "dominating story the male has set". This is based on the band's idea that unreliable male narrators "portray women as submissive characters in their story".

Track listing

References

2021 songs
2021 singles
British songs
Warp (record label) singles